The men's tournament of the football at the 2022 South American Games was held from 4 to 12 October 2022 at the Complejo de Fútbol in Luque, Paraguay, a sub-venue outside Asunción. It was the ninth staging of the football men's tournament since its first appearance in the South American Games' first edition in La Paz 1978.

The tournament was officially restricted to under-19 players (born on or after 1 January 2003).

The defending champions Chile were unable to retain their title after being eliminated in the group stage.

Paraguay won the gold medal and their second South American Games men's football title after defeating Ecuador by a 1–0 score in the final. Colombia beat Uruguay 2–1 in the third place match to win the bronze medal.

Schedule
The tournament was held over a 9-day period, from 4 to 12 October.

Teams
A total of eight ODESUR NOCs entered teams for the men's tournament.

Squads

Each participating NOC had to enter a squad of 18 players (Technical manual Article 9). Players had to be born on or after 1 January 2003 to be eligible (Technical manual Article 1).

Venue
All matches were played at the Complejo de Fútbol courts located within the Parque Olímpico cluster in Luque, Paraguay, owned by the Paraguayan Olympic Committee.

Results
All match times are in PYST (UTC−3).

Group stage
The group stage consisted of two groups of 4 teams, each group was played under the round-robin format with the top two teams progressing to the semi-finals.

Teams were ranked according to points earned (3 points for a win, 1 point for a draw, 0 points for a loss). If tied on points,  the following tiebreakers were applied (Technical manual Article 10.1):
Goal difference;
Goals scored;
Fewest goals against;
Fewest red cards received;
Fewest yellow cards received;
Drawing of lots.

Group A

Group B

Final stage
The final stage consisted of the semi-finals and bronze and gold medal matches. The semi-finals match-ups were:

Semifinal 1: Group B winners v Group A runners-up
Semifinal 2: Group A winners v Group B runners-up

In the final stage, if a match had been tied after 90 minutes, the match would have been decided by a penalty shoot-out. Winners of semi-finals played the gold medal match, while losers played the bronze medal match.

Semi-finals

Bronze medal match

Gold medal match

Goalscorers

Final ranking

Medalists

See also
Football at the 2022 South American Games – Women's tournament

References

External links
 ASU2022 Soccer Teams Male at ASU2022 official website.

Football